Inspector Gadget 2 (sometimes called Inspector 2 Gadget and IG2) is a 2003 American superhero comedy film released direct-to-video on VHS and DVD on March 11, 2003. The film is based on the 1983 cartoon series created by DIC Entertainment and is a sequel to the 1999 film, Inspector Gadget. This was made three years after Disney lost the rights to DIC Entertainment, as Disney currently owns the live-action film rights to Inspector Gadget.

Unlike the first film (which has a serious and darker tone and received a PG rating), Inspector Gadget 2 received a G rating and is considered a more faithful adaptation of the original animated series; the characters' personalities were altered to be more in line with their cartoon counterparts and Doctor Claw's face is never shown. Gadget and Claw are never referred to as "John Brown" and "Sanford Scolex", their respective civilian names from the first film (though Claw's communicator is still labeled as "Scolex Industries"; Claw also reveals to his minions that all his assets, including his "multi-million-dollar high-rise evil headquarters", were confiscated by the police following his arrest in the previous film). The film received mixed reviews, although its reception slightly improved over its predecessor.

With the exception of D. L. Hughley, who returned as the voice of the Gadgetmobile, none of the actors from the 1999 film reprised their roles.

Plot 
Sometime after the events of the first film, Inspector Gadget and his Gadgetmobile are having problems in their line of work, mostly because of Gadget overreacting to minor crimes. Gadget is put on probation by an angry Chief Quimby after charging Quimby's mother for going slightly above the speed limit on a mostly-deserted highway. At this time, Dr. Claw escapes from prison, seeking revenge on Gadget for putting him in prison and to restart his multi-million-dollar empire. Mayor Wilson takes this opportunity to create G2, a female Gadget-type robot to replace the original; since his gadgets are malfunctioning. Gadget begins to fall in love with G2, though G2 does not reciprocate as she prefers to work alone, viewing him as a nuisance but at the same time appreciating his determination to fight crime.

Dr. Claw begins a new plan to steal gold from the Federal Reserve. Gadget makes repeated attempts to stop Claw, but is continually foiled by his own bumbling and gadgetry glitches; his antics also prevent G2 from stopping Claw. Gadget's bumbling allows Dr. Claw's men to steal components for Claw's latest scheme and get away with it. Chief Quimby becomes increasingly frustrated and eventually relieves Gadget of duty after an incident at a science convention involving Claw's men putting an override chip on Gadget, allowing Claw to control Gadget like a puppet and cause significant damage. Penny offers to help, but Gadget tells her that she is still too young and to not get involved. Meanwhile, Dr. Claw's henchmen are now free to steal the rest of the components for Claw's scheme.

Penny decides to examine the evidence on her own and eventually finds Claw's hideout at an abandoned bowling factory in the outskirts of the city. She infiltrates the hideout, but Claw and his men capture her. After a series of unsuccessful jobs, Gadget gets a job as a parking valet. At Mayor Wilson's fundraiser, Claw infiltrates the event and activates a bowling pin containing laughing gas to keep the people busy as he steals a 50,000-karat ruby, though G2 is immune to the gas. In order to stop her, Claw uses a magnet to trap G2. Afterwards, Claw and his minions escape, but Gadget fails to recognize them. The Mayor orders Quimby to deactivate G2 and terminate the Gadget program; distract the public from the police's incompetence in stopping Claw.

Gadget goes to Baxter's laboratory to reactivate G2, which makes G2 realize that Gadget cares for her. Brain (voiced by Jeff Glenn Bennett), having escaped Claw's men, tells them through Baxter's bark translating device that Claw has kidnapped Penny and has used the three stolen supplies (ionic fuel cells, a protoid laser, and a ruby) to build a super-weapon. Upon realizing that Claw is based in the bowling factory, Gadget finally connects the evidence Penny previously presented to him. Gadget asks G2 to help him save Penny and foil Claw's scheme, and G2 agrees.

The next day, Claw activates his machine. The weapon is a laser that freezes time in Riverton, allowing Claw and his minions to easily rob the Federal Reserve. Claw has plans to not only use the laser against Riverton, but also the entire world, so he can rob other valuables. Both Gadgets manage to avoid the weapon's blast, and confront Claw and his minions at the Federal Reserve. Claw orders his minions to attack Gadget and G2 so he can get away. Gadget and G2 decide to switch chips in order to make Gadget work perfectly, leaving G2 to deal with the glitches but to still successfully capture Claw's hired goons. Gadget chases after Claw but Claw drops Penny off the truck with explosives attached to her. After saving Penny, Gadget and Penny reunite with G2 and the Gadgetmobile. At a bridge, Gadget stops Claw's truck with a puddle of bubble gum. Claw's minions try to escape, but get stuck in the bubble gum and are arrested. When Gadget orders Claw to surrender, Claw gets away in a rocket-like escape pod. After Claw escapes, Gadget, Penny and G2 go to Claw's laser to unfreeze Riverton.

Both Gadget and G2 are congratulated by Mayor Wilson and Chief Quimby (who happily reinstates Gadget) for their heroic efforts, with Gadget also giving credit to Penny, admitting he is proud to have her as a partner and awarding her a Junior Inspector Medal for her meritorious conduct. After the meeting, Gadget and G2 share a kiss outside the city hall. In the process, fireworks emerge from Gadget's hat. A firecracker lands right near Quimby and Wilson and the fuse burns out. After a few seconds, it explodes, causing both Wilson and Quimby to angrily yell out to Gadget.

Cast
 French Stewart as Inspector Gadget
 Elaine Hendrix as G2
 Tony Martin as Dr. Claw
 Caitlin Wachs as Penny
 Jeff Glenn Bennett as Brain the Dog (voice)
 D. L. Hughley as Gadgetmobile (voice)
 Mark Mitchell as Chief Quimby
 Sigrid Thornton as Mayor Wilson
 Bruce Spence as Baxter
 Alethea McGrath as Mrs. Quimby (cameo)
 Mungo McKay as the Bartender
 James Wardlaw as Brick
 John Batchelor as McKible
 Nick Lawson as Squint
 Mick Roughan as Jungle Bob
 Siros Niaros as The Ninja
 Brian McDermott as Mr. Morgan

Production
The film was shot entirely in and around Brisbane, Queensland, Australia. Filming locations included the Queensland University of Technology Gardens Point Campus, Queensland Parliament House, University of Queensland St. Lucia Campus, South Bank Parklands Beach, Toowong Village, Anglican Church Grammar School and the William Jolly Bridge.

Release
Inspector Gadget 2 was released on DVD and VHS on March 11, 2003, four years after its predecessor was released.

Reception
The film received mixed reviews, although more favorable than its predecessor.

Joe Leydon of Variety gave the film a negative review. Radio Times gave the film a two out of five stars. Common Sense Media gave the film a three out of five stars, writing that the film has cartoonish violence.

References

External links

 
 
                                          
 

2000s English-language films
2003 direct-to-video films
2003 action comedy films
2000s science fiction comedy films
American action comedy films
American coming-of-age films
Australian coming-of-age films
Australian action comedy films
American films with live action and animation
American superhero films
Android (robot) films
Cyborg films
Disney direct-to-video films
2000s superhero comedy films
Films directed by Alex Zamm
Films set in 2002
Live-action films based on animated series
Inspector Gadget
Direct-to-video sequel films
Direct-to-video action comedy films
Films shot in Brisbane
2000s police comedy films
2000s American films